Austrocordulia refracta is a species of dragonfly in the family Austrocorduliidae,
commonly known as the eastern hawk. 
It is a medium-sized, dull brown dragonfly,
endemic to eastern Australia, where it inhabits streams and pools.

Gallery

Note
There is uncertainty about which family Austrocordulia refracta best belongs to: Austrocorduliidae, Synthemistidae, or Corduliidae.

See also
 List of Odonata species of Australia

References

Austrocorduliidae
Odonata of Australia
Endemic fauna of Australia
Taxa named by Robert John Tillyard
Insects described in 1908